Steve Bell may refer to:

 Steve Bell (news anchor) (1935–2019), first anchor of the ABC News program World News This Morning, previously reporter for WOWT-TV
 Steve Bell (cartoonist) (born 1951), English cartoonist
 Steve Bell (musician) (born 1960), Canadian musician
 Steve Bell (soccer) (born 1975), retired American soccer midfielder
 Steve Bell (Ackley Bridge), fictional character
 Steven Bell (born 1976), Australian rugby league player
 Steven Bell (footballer) (born 1985), Scottish footballer

See also
 Stephen Bell (1965–2001), English footballer